Scènes de ballet may refer to:

Music 
 Scènes de ballet (Stravinsky), 1944 ballet music by Igor Stravinsky
 Scène de ballet, Op. 100, music by Charles Auguste de Bériot

Ballets to the Stravinsky music 
 The original production choreographed by Anton Dolin
 Scènes de ballet (Ashton), a 1947–1948 ballet by Frederick Ashton
 Scènes de ballet (Taras), a 1972 ballet by John Taras
 Scènes de ballet (Wheeldon), a 1999 ballet by Christopher Wheeldon